Veronica Curtin is a camogie player. She won camogie All Star awards in 2006 and 2007 and played in the 2008, 2010 and 2011 All Ireland finals and 2009 All Ireland club final. With a total of 5-15 she was the sixth highest scoring player in the Senior Championship of 2011. She was an All-Star nominee in 2010.

Career
She scored 1-5 out of Galway's total of 1-6 when her county won the National League in 2005. She scored two goals in Galway's dramatic All Ireland semi-final draw with Cork in the 2010 championship.

Awards

 All Ireland medal winner when Galway won their first title in 1996
 Senior Gael Linn Cup 2000 and 2008
 Junior Gael Linn Cup 2007
 Senior National League
 Junior All Ireland 1994
 All Ireland Minor 1994 
 Player of the match in All Ireland Minor and All Ireland Junior finals of 1994

References

External links
 Official camogie website
 Galway Camogie website
 Veronica Curtin profile in Irish Times, 21 August 2010

Living people
Galway camogie players
Year of birth missing (living people)